George Ashburnham may refer to:
 George Ashburnham, 3rd Earl of Ashburnham (1760–1830), British peer
 George Ashburnham, Viscount St Asaph (1785–1813), British politician